List of ambassadors from South Korea, by country or body where representation took place in parentheses:

Current ambassadors

Ambassadors to international organization 

South Korean
List

South Korea diplomacy-related lists